"Weapon of Choice" is a song by English big beat musician Fatboy Slim from his third studio album, Halfway Between the Gutter and the Stars. It features American funk musician Bootsy Collins. It was released as a double A-side single with "Star 69" on 23 April 2001, as well as a standalone single release, and a 2010 re-release with remixes. The single peaked at No. 10 on the UK Singles Chart.

The music video, directed by Spike Jonze, features actor Christopher Walken dancing around a deserted hotel lobby. It won multiple awards at the 2001 MTV Video Music Awards and won the 2002 Grammy Award for Best Music Video.

Background

"Weapon of Choice" features a lead vocal by Bootsy Collins, known as a member of the funk group Parliament-Funkadelic and leader of Bootsy's Rubber Band. On the album version, Collins's normal vocals are heard through the right audio channel; the same vocals, distorted to a much deeper pitch, are heard through the left. The song features a prominent sample of Sly & the Family Stone's 1968 song "Into My Own Thing", as well as samples from "All Strung Out Over You" by The Chambers Brothers and "Word Play" by The X-Ecutioners, the latter of which was previously sampled on another Fatboy Slim song, "Don't Forget Your Teeth", the B-side to his single "Right Here, Right Now", and "Gangster Trippin".

The chorus of the song, "You could blow with this, or you could blow with that", is an homage to the Black Sheep song "The Choice Is Yours (Revisited)", which has a similar chorus. The lines "Walk without rhythm/and it won't attract the worm" quote the science fiction novel Dune, while the line "tone of my voice" may be the titular weapon, as used by some of the book's characters. The line "halfway between the gutter and the stars" refers to a line in Oscar Wilde's play Lady Windermere's Fan: "We are all of us in the gutter, but some of us are looking at the stars", and was also used as the album title.

The radio edit is referred to as the "Attack Hamster Edit", and is the version featured on Fatboy Slim's greatest hits album The Greatest Hits – Why Try Harder. Collins's vocal tracks, both normal and distorted, remain intact, but the distorted track is barely audible. It peaked at No. 137 on the UK Singles Chart. The song was briefly featured in the 2001 film Joe Somebody, the Malcolm in the Middle episode "Malcolm vs. Reese" and the 2006 film Night at the Museum. It was used in the E3 trailer of Skylanders: Swap Force in 2013.

On the album, the song segues from "Retox" and thus the ending of "Retox" is on this track. At 5:06 on the "single version", the last second (5:05) gets repeated many times until it finishes at 5:36. On the album, the last two seconds get repeated until 5:23, and scratching sounds start at 5:14 until the conclusion at 5:45. The single version and album version also have several other differences, including the ordering of vocal snippets towards the five-minute mark.

Music video

The music video was filmed in the lobby of the Marriott Hotel (now the L.A. Grand Hotel Downtown) in Los Angeles in December 2000. Directed by Spike Jonze, it features actor Christopher Walken, who trained as a dancer in musical theatre before his acting career. Walken had asked Jonze to film his dancing, and Jonze suggested that he participate in the video. Fatboy Slim had originally been scheduled to have a cameo in the video, replacing Walken in the harness shots, but was unavailable that weekend because his wife was giving birth.

In the video, Walken is relaxing in a chair in a deserted hotel lobby, when he hears the song being played from a cleaning cart nearby. He begins to dance around the hotel, then gets in an elevator, leaps off the balcony, and flies around the mezzanine before returning to the chair and sitting back down. 

The "Weapon of Choice" video won six awards at the 2001 MTV Video Music Awards. Walken was awarded one of MTV's "Moonmen" for Best Choreography. The clip was also ranked number one in a list of the top 100 videos of all time by VH1 in April 2002 compiled from a music industry survey. The Swedish actor Mikael Persbrandt has also danced in a version of the video directed by Malik Bendjelloul. In 2012, British comedian and presenter Rowland Rivron also won charity TV show Let's Dance for Sport Relief with his reenactment of the video's choreography.

Walken has cited admiration for Jonze as one of his main reasons for appearing in the video, which he also welcomed as a chance to do "something different". He also noted that as a trained tap dancer, dancing to electronic music suited him well.

The video was remastered to 4K in 2021.

Track listing 

"Star 69" / "Weapon of Choice"

"Weapon of Choice 2010"

Accolades

|-
| align="center" rowspan="10" | 2001
| align="center" rowspan="9" | MTV Video Music Award
| align="center" | Video of the Year
| 
|-
| align="center" | Best Dance Video
| 
|-
| align="center" | Breakthrough Video
| 
|-
| align="center" | Best Direction
| 
|-
| align="center" | Best Choreography
| 
|-
| align="center" | Best Visual Effects
| 
|-
| align="center" | Best Art Direction
| 
|-
| align="center" | Best Editing
| 
|-
| align="center" | Best Cinematography
| 
|-
| align="center" | MTV Europe Music Award
| align="center" | Best Video
| 
|-
| align="center" | 2002
| align="center" | Grammy Award
| align="center" | Best Music Video
| 
|}

Charts
"Star 69" / "Weapon of Choice" double A-side chart positions

Other versions

 1 – "Weapon of Choice"

References

External links

2001 singles
Music videos directed by Spike Jonze
Fatboy Slim songs
Bootsy Collins songs
MTV Video Music Award for Best Direction
Grammy Award for Best Short Form Music Video
Marriott International
Songs written by Norman Cook
2000 songs
Astralwerks singles
Skint Records singles
Music based on Dune (franchise)